Carbon detonation or carbon deflagration is the violent reignition of thermonuclear fusion in a white dwarf star that was previously slowly cooling. It involves a runaway thermonuclear process which spreads through the white dwarf in a matter of seconds, producing a type Ia supernova which releases an immense amount of energy as the star is blown apart. The carbon detonation/deflagration process leads to a supernova by a different route than the better known type II (core-collapse) supernova (the type II is caused by the cataclysmic explosion of the outer layers of a massive star as its core implodes).

White dwarf density and mass increase
A white dwarf is the remnant of a small to medium size star (the Sun is an example of these). At the end of its life, the star has burned its hydrogen and helium fuel, and thermonuclear fusion processes cease. The star does not have enough mass to either burn much heavier elements, or to implode into a neutron star or type II supernova as a larger star can, from the force of its own gravity, so it gradually shrinks and becomes very dense as it cools, glowing white and then red, for a period many times longer than the present age of the Universe.

Occasionally, a white dwarf gains mass from another source – for example, a binary star companion that is close enough for the dwarf star to siphon sufficient amounts of matter onto itself; or from a collision with other stars, the siphoned matter having been expelled during the process of the companion's own late stage stellar evolution. If the white dwarf gains enough matter, its internal pressure and temperature will rise enough for carbon to begin fusing in its core. Carbon detonation generally occurs at the point when the accreted matter pushes the white dwarf's mass close to the Chandrasekhar limit of roughly 1.4 solar masses, the mass at which gravity can overcome the electron degeneracy pressure that prevents it from collapsing during its lifetime. This also happens when two white dwarfs merge if the combined mass is over the Chandrasekhar limit, resulting in a type Ia supernova.

A main sequence star supported by thermal pressure would expand and cool which automatically counterbalances an increase in thermal energy. However, degeneracy pressure is independent of temperature; the white dwarf is unable to regulate the fusion process in the manner of normal stars, so it is vulnerable to a runaway fusion reaction.

Fusion and pressure
In the case of a white dwarf, the restarted fusion reactions releases heat, but the outward pressure that exists in the star and supports it against further collapse is initially due almost entirely to degeneracy pressure, not fusion processes or heat. Therefore, even when fusion recommences, the outward pressure that is key to the star's thermal balance does not increase much. One result is that the star does not expand  much to balance its fusion and heat processes with gravity and electron pressure, as it did when burning hydrogen (until too late). This increase of heat production without a means of cooling by expansion raises the internal temperature dramatically, and therefore the rate of fusion also increases extremely fast as well, a form of positive feedback known as thermal runaway.

A 2004 analysis of such a process states that:

Supercritical event
The flame accelerates dramatically, in part due to the Rayleigh–Taylor instability and interactions with turbulence.  The resumption of fusion spreads outward in a series of uneven, expanding "bubbles" in accordance with Rayleigh–Taylor instability.  Within the fusion area, the increase in heat with unchanged volume results in an exponentially rapid increase in the rate of fusion – a sort of supercritical event as thermal pressure increases boundlessly.  As hydrostatic equilibrium is not possible in this situation, a "thermonuclear flame" is triggered and an explosive eruption through the dwarf star's surface that completely disrupts it, seen as a type Ia supernova.

Regardless of the exact details of this nuclear fusion, it is generally accepted that a substantial fraction of the carbon and oxygen in the white dwarf is converted into heavier elements within a period of only a few seconds, raising the internal temperature to billions of degrees. This energy release from thermonuclear fusion  (1–) is more than enough to unbind the star; that is, the individual particles making up the white dwarf gain enough kinetic energy to fly apart from each other. The star explodes violently and releases a shock wave in which matter is typically ejected at speeds on the order of 5,000–, roughly 6% of the speed of light. The energy released in the explosion also causes an extreme increase in luminosity. The typical visual absolute magnitude of type Ia supernovae is Mv = −19.3 (about 5 billion times brighter than the Sun), with little variation. 
This process, of a volume supported by electron degeneracy pressure instead of thermal pressure gradually reaching conditions capable of igniting runaway fusion, is also found in a less dramatic form in a helium flash in the core of a sufficiently massive red giant star.

See also
 Helium flash, a similar (although less cataclysmic) sudden initiation of fusion
 Nuclear fusion

References

External links
JINA: Type Ia Supernova Flame Models
A Computer Simulation of Carbon Detonation/Deflagration

Stellar evolution
Stellar phenomena
White dwarfs